Cancer Hospital & Research Institute is a Regional Cancer Centre funded by the Government of India in Gwalior. The institution was founded as a medical college department affiliated to the Jiwaji University of Gwalior.

References 

Hospitals in Madhya Pradesh
Regional Cancer Centres in India
Buildings and structures in Gwalior
Research institutes in Madhya Pradesh
Year of establishment missing